Full Circle is the debut album of Pittsburgh rock/pop musician Jimmie Ross, best known as a member of the Jaggerz. The album, released in 2010 contains the best of his songs from the Jaggerz.

Track listing 
 "Love Music"
 "Gotta Find My Way Back Home"
 "It's Gonna Take a Miracle/I'm on the Outside Looking In"
 "I've Never Found Me a Girl (Who Loves Me Like You Do)"
 "Gonna Move Across the River"
 "The Whole Town's Laughing at Me"
 "Shame on You"
 "That's My World"
 "Let Me Be Your Man"
 "The Rapper" (live)

References 

2010 albums